The City of Portland was a local government area about  west-southwest of Melbourne, the state capital of Victoria, Australia. Its area was surrounded by the Shire of Heywood, formerly known as the Shire of Portland, and the Southern Ocean.

History

Portland was incorporated as a municipal district on 17 December 1855. It became a borough in 1863, and a town on 19 November 1949. It was proclaimed a city on 28 October 1985.

On 23 September 1994, the City of Portland was abolished, and along with parts of the Shires of Glenelg and Heywood, was merged into the new Shire of Glenelg.

The City of Portland was not subdivided into wards, and the nine councillors represented the entire area.

Towns and localities
 Portland*
 Portland North
 Portland West

* Council seat.

Population

* Estimate in the 1958 Victorian Year Book.

References

External links
 Victorian Places - Portland

Portland City
Portland, Victoria